Mạc Kính Vũ (莫敬宇, ?–?) was the tenth emperor of the Mạc dynasty. He reigned from 1638 – 1677. 

He ascended the throne in 1638. He was a supporter of Wu Sangui. After the Revolt of the Three Feudatories was pacificated, he was attacked by Trịnh lord, and fled to Qing China. He was no longer supported by Qing China, and died there in exile.

References

Mạc dynasty emperors